Yamaguchi (山口, "mountain entrance/gateway") is the 14th most common Japanese surname. Notable people with the surname include:

Adam Yamaguchi, American television correspondent and producer
, Japanese badminton player
, Japanese swimmer
, Japanese artist
Atsushi Yamaguchi (disambiguation), multiple people
, Japanese Noh mask carver
Eri Yamaguchi (disambiguation), multiple people
, Japanese shogi player
, Japanese gravure idol
, Japanese karateka
, Japanese shakuhachi musician
, Japanese mob boss
Hatsuye Yamaguchi (1911-2005), Japanese-American artist and dollmaker
Hideko Yamaguchi, plaintiff foster mother in Sweden v. Yamaguchi, a famous international family law trial
, Japanese sumo wrestler
, Japanese novelist and essayist
, Japanese painter
, Japanese footballer
, Japanese musician
, Japanese actress
, Japanese composer
Junya Yamaguchi, Japanese musician
, Japanese judoka
, Japanese actor and voice actor
, Japanese painter
, Japanese film director
Kazuki Yamaguchi (disambiguation), multiple people
, Japanese footballer
, Japanese sociologist
, Japanese footballer
, Japanese boxer
, Japanese voice actor
, Japanese bicycle framebuilder
, Japanese long-distance runner
Kristi Yamaguchi (born 1971), American figure skater
, Japanese volleyball player
, Japanese origami artist
, Japanese women's footballer
, Japanese mixed martial artist
, Japanese rugby sevens player
Masa Yamaguchi (born 1974), Australian actor
Masakatsu Yamaguchi, plaintiff foster father in Sweden v. Yamaguchi, a famous international family law trial
, Japanese manga artist
, Japanese anthropologist
Masaya Yamaguchi (born 1970), American jazz guitarist and music writer
, Japanese scientist
, Japanese government official
, Japanese voice actress
, Japanese voice actress
, Japanese mixed martial artist and kickboxer
Michael Yamaguchi, American lawyer
, Japanese swimmer
, Japanese actress
, Japanese television personality
, Japanese singer, actress and idol
, Japanese footballer and manager
, Japanese voice actress
Noboru Yamaguchi (disambiguation), multiple people
, Japanese politician
, Japanese ultranationalist best known for his assassination of Inejiro Asanuma
, Japanese footballer
, Japanese voice actress
, Japanese voice actress
Roy Yamaguchi, Japanese-American chef
, Japanese anime screenwriter
Satoshi Yamaguchi (disambiguation), multiple people
, Japanese parasitologist
, Japanese actress
, Japanese model and actress
, Japanese women's footballer
, Japanese aikidoka
, Japanese footballer
, Japanese artist
, Japanese anti–nuclear weapons activist
, Japanese footballer
, Japanese actor
, Japanese baseball player
, Japanese politician
, Japanese painter
, Japanese Buddhist scholar
, Imperial Japanese Navy officer
, Japanese politician
, Japanese footballer
, Japanese architect
, Japanese actor
Takayuki Yamaguchi (disambiguation), multiple people
, Japanese painter
, Japanese footballer
, Imperial Japanese Navy admiral
, Japanese voice actor
Tatsuya Yamaguchi (disambiguation), multiple people
Tazuo Yamaguchi, American poet and filmmaker
, Japanese footballer
, Japanese sprint canoeist
, Japanese baseball player
, Japanese middle-distance runner
, Japanese actress and voice actress
Tomomi Yamaguchi, Japanese anthropologist
, Japanese comedian, actor and voice actor
, Japanese footballer
, Japanese politician
, Japanese manga artist
, Japanese national who survived both the Hiroshima and Nagasaki atomic bombings during the Second World War
Tsuyoshi Yamaguchi (disambiguation), multiple people
Wally Yamaguchi (1959–1958), also known as Yamaguchi-san, Japanese professional wrestling manager and sports journalist
, Japanese video game artist and designer
, Japanese lyricist and writer
, Japanese film director
, Japanese rugby union player
, Chinese-born Japanese actress and singer
, Japanese politician
, Japanese footballer and manager
, Japanese film director
, Japanese sprinter
, Japanese character designer and illustrator
, Japanese animator
, Japanese voice actress
Yuriko Yamaguchi (sculptor) (born 1948), Japanese-American sculptor
, Japanese businessman and economist
, Japanese Buddhist scholar and Tibetologist

Fictional characters
, a character in the manga series Hajime no Ippo
, a character in the manga series GA Geijutsuka Art Design Class
, a character in the manga series Gokusen
, a character in the manga series Haikyu!!

References

Japanese-language surnames